The Great Tenmei famine (天明の大飢饉, Tenmei no daikikin) was a famine which affected Japan during the Edo period. It is considered to have begun in 1782, and lasted until 1788. It was named after the Tenmei era (1781–1789), during the reign of Emperor Kōkaku. The ruling shoguns during the famine were Tokugawa Ieharu and Tokugawa Ienari. The famine was the deadliest one during the early modern period in Japan.

Causes

The 1783 eruption of Mount Asama is said to have caused the Great Tenmei famine. Starting in the 1770s, there was a sharp decline in crop yield in Tōhoku, which is the north-eastern region of Honshū, due to poor and cold weather, so food stocks in rural areas were exhausted. The situation was exacerbated by natural disasters: Mount Iwaki erupted on April 13, 1783 (3rd month, 12th day, in the year Tenmei-3, according to the Japanese calendar), as did Mount Asama on July 6, so volcanic ash was sent down into the atmosphere of Japan. Aside from the direct damage caused by the eruptions, this led to a fall in solar radiation, resulting in cold weather that catastrophically damaged crops. The massive Icelandic Laki eruption of 1783 disrupted weather patterns all over the Northern Hemisphere, and may have worsened matters as well. 

Another cause of the famine was the government's economic policies. The famine spread largely due to mismanagement by the Shogunate. During this period, a mercantilist policy was implemented by Tanuma Okitsugu, a minister of the Tokugawa shogunate cabinet. This was intended to commercialize agriculture and thus increase tax income, which was paid in rice. The policy caused economic difficulties for many Hans and led to excessive investment in rice production (which was vulnerable to cold weather) in order to pay the higher taxes. It also resulted in local emergency stores of food becoming depleted. The climatic, volcanic and economic factors combined to result in poor harvests and a lack of emergency stores, which led to skyrocketing rice prices, so serious famine expanded to a national scale as a result.

Results
The summer on the pacific side of the Tōhoku region was foggy and rainy. The cold weather required people to wear thick cotton clothing. According to Nochi-mi-gusa, written by Genpaku Sugita, approximately twenty thousand people starved to death, mainly in rural areas of the Tōhoku region. However, many local authorities, afraid of being accused of economic mismanagement, did not report the full extent of the damage, so the actual death toll may have been far higher, perhaps even ten times Sugita's estimate. The outcome was particularly severe in Mutsu Province, where it was reported that over a hundred thousand people died. Including people who fled the area, Hirosaki (Tsugaru) Han lost almost half of its population. The combined impact of famine and outbreaks of disease resulted in a population decline of more than 920,000 people across Japan between 1780 and 1786.

Population history
The effects of the famine can be seen from the census numbers for the years before, during, and after the famine recorded for all of Japan and in the Tohoku region, specifically.

Japan

1774 (An'ei 3) 25,990,000
1780 (An'ei 9) 26,010,000
1786 (Tenmei 6) 25,090,000
1792 (Kansei 4) 24,890,000
1798 (Kansei 10) 25,470,000

Tohoku 
1750 (Kan'en 3) 2,680,000
1786 (Tenmei 6) 2,370,000
1804 (Bunka 1) 2,470,000
1828 (Bunsei 11) 2,630,000

References

See also
Tenmei eruption - Eruption of Mount Asama in 1783. This eruption is said to have caused the Great Tenmei famine.

Natural disasters in Japan
1780s in Japan
18th-century health disasters
Famines in Japan
18th-century famines 
18th-century disasters in Japan
1780s disasters in Asia 
1782 disasters in Asia